Andrew Thomson Blake McGowan is a Scottish theologian and pastor. McGowan was the founding principal of Highland Theological College, serving from 1994 to 2009, after which he became minister of the Inverness East Church of Scotland congregation. He chairs the Theological Commission of the World Reformed Fellowship, and is president of the Scottish Evangelical Theology Society.

McGowan's 2007 book, The Divine Spiration of Scripture "led to some considerable discussion in evangelical circles." In it, McGowan suggested the word "spiration" in place of "inspiration" and argued against the concept of biblical inerrancy, instead being in favour of a type of infallibility. Norman Geisler and William C. Roach suggest that McGowan's "challenge to inerrancy is one of the most dangerous because it is clear, direct, and comes from within evangelicalism."

References

Living people
University and college founders
Academics of the University of the Highlands and Islands
20th-century Ministers of the Church of Scotland
Scottish Calvinist and Reformed theologians
Presidents of Calvinist and Reformed seminaries
Year of birth missing (living people)
21st-century Ministers of the Church of Scotland